"Amarillo" is a song by Colombian singer J Balvin. It was released on 19 March 2020 as the fourth single from his studio album Colores.

Background and release 
On 16 February 2020, Balvin announced the track along with the album through his social media. Alongside the publication, he shared a preview of the music video for "Amarillo", which shows the singer in yellow and orange clothes and hair. The track premiered on 19 March 2020, the same day he premiered from his fourth studio album Colores. The song served as the fourth single of the album.

Composition 
The song was written by the singer alongside Alejandro Ramírez, Afro Bros, William Grigachcine and Ronald Hernandez was performed under the production of Sky Rompiendo and DJ Snake.

In an interview for Apple Music, Balvin commented that "Amarillo is a very energetic song and is ready for nightclubs. A lot of people know about J Balvin, but few know about José, so it's the first song on the album, because as soon as they hear it, I want them to feel the color and power of the song."

Music video 
The music video for "Amarillo" premiered on 19 March 2020 and was directed by Colin Tilley.

Charts

Weekly charts

Year-end charts

Certifications

References 

Spanish-language songs
Reggaeton songs
2020 songs
2020 singles
J Balvin songs
Songs written by J Balvin
Music videos directed by Colin Tilley
Songs written by DJ Snake